BLØF is a Dutch rock band from Vlissingen, Zeeland, founded in 1992 by Peter Slager. Current members are Peter Slager (bass), Paskal Jakobsen (lead vocals and guitar), Bas Kennis (keyboards), and Norman Bonink (drums). Former members are Henk Tjoonk (drums) and Chris Götte (drums).

The group is one of the most popular bands in the Netherlands and has won 8 Edison Awards. In 2000, 2001, 2003, and 2004, they received the Edison Award for "Best Band in the Netherlands".

Outside of the Netherlands, they are best known for their collaborations with international musicians.

When BLØF played in Bhutan as part of their Umoja project in 2006, it was the biggest concert in terms of attendance the country had seen to date.

Biography

Beginnings
BLØF was founded in 1992 by Peter Slager, and originally consisted of Slager on bass guitar, Paskal Jakobsen on guitar, Bas Kennis on keyboards, and Henk Tjoonk on drums.

They recorded their 1994 debut album Naakt Onder De Hemel in just one week. Drummer Tjoonk suggested  they distribute the album themselves. The self-produced, self-promoted album was a hit in their home province of Zeeland and the single "Aan de Kust" became a local hit, despite it having little airplay on national radio stations. The album was well received by critics and through this positive attention, the band secured a national distribution contract with EMI Music,  Keyboardist Kennis credits their early success partly to the rudimentary website they had live already in 1995, giving fans access to the band and a direct way to find out more about their music and tour dates . For this album, BLØF received a "Best New Talent"  award and with the prize money they recorded their second album, Helder, released in September 1997.

Early years
In 1997, internal struggles almost led to the band's breakup, and saw drummer Henk Tjoonk fired and replaced by Chris Götte. With the help of ex-Doe Maar manager Frank van der Meijden, the band landed a full recording contract with EMI. The first single released after these changes, "Liefs uit Londen", was a national success. BLØF released two additional singles, updated versions of "Aan De Kust" and "Wat Zou Je Doen", from a live recording of a performance in The Nighttrain, a discotheque in Middelburg. The original versions of both songs appeared on the band's first album. Both songs became hit singles.

Breakthrough
In the summer of 1998, BLØF released XXL Live Met Het Zeeuws Orkest, a live album recorded with an orchestra from Zeeland. With the help of Peter Bauwers (2 Unlimited) and Ronald Vanhuffel, they released the studio album Boven. 
This album had a stronger rock sound and saw the single "Harder Dan Ik Hebben Kan" become a hit in less than a month. 
In 2000, the band received an Edison Award for Best Dutch Band and they performed for the Dutch Olympians and their crew at the 2000 Summer Olympics in Sydney.

After this, the successful Watermakers was released and in  2001, BLØF once again won an Edison for Best Dutch Band.

On 17 March 2001, Drummer Chris Götte was killed in a motorcycle accident while riding from his home to the venue where the band was scheduled to perform later that day. The band took a hiatus from performing and one year later, they released the live CD Oog In Oog — Live I in Ahoy, the last concert with Götte. Götte was replaced by Norman Bonink, who had previously played in Frank Boeijen's band. Their next album, Blauwe Ruis, released in 2002, was dedicated to Götte and his family. In 2003, BLØF released a lighter, more positive album called Omarm.

In 2003, they travelled to Kenya to play with local musicians. They used this experience as an inspiration for their seventh studio album.

In 2004, the American band Counting Crows toured with BLØF, and together they rerecorded "Holiday in Spain", a duet sung in both English and Dutch, which gave BLØF exposure in the United States.

In 2005, BLØF travelled around the world in order to be exposed to new cultures and inspirations for a new album. These efforts saw the release of a new album, Umoja, in 2006. 
The goal of the Umoja project was to raise awareness for the Millennium Development Goals. The band collaborated with artists from the 12 countries they visited. The project resulted in a book, Umoja Travel Lodge, concerts in the Netherlands, and a DVD of the Umoja concerts the band performed in the Netherlands with some of the international musicians that participated in the project. The project was very demanding for the band and they later stated that they greatly underestimated the amount of work involved with a project of that scale.

For their next album, Oktober, released in October 2008, the band decided on a stripped-down sound. All tracks were recorded in one take with no overdubs. 
Further recording sessions in January and February 2008 produced enough additional material, so another album, April, was released in early 2009.

Neither Oktober nor April were successful, so the band went back to the drawing board with the promise of returning to the sound that made them successful previously. This album, Alles Blijft Anders, was released in February 2011.

In 2015, BLØF celebrated the 10th edition of Concert at SEA, an annual multi-day music festival organized by the band in Brouwersdam in Zeeland.

In 2016, the band members took time out for solo projects: Jakobsen embarked on a theatre tour performing his favourite songs and Slager released the solo album Slik.

In April 2017, BLØF put out the album AAN, featuring a collaboration with rapper Typhoon and a tribute to Thé Lau, the late frontman of The Scene, who was a close friend of Jakobsen's. Zoutelande, a Dutch cover of the German song "Frankfurt Oder" by Bosse was rerecorded as a duet with Belgian singer Geike Arnaert. It reached #1 in January 2018 and stayed there for more than ten weeks. Later in 2018, they released the single "Omarm me" in collaboration with Dutch rapper Ronnie Flex.

Band members

Lineups

Discography 

 Naakt onder de hemel (1995)
 Helder (1997)
 Boven (1999)
 Watermakers (2000)
 Blauwe Ruis (2002)
 Omarm (2003)
 Umoja (2006)
 Oktober (2008)
 April (2009)
 Alles Blijft Anders (2011)
 In Het Midden van Alles (2014)
 De Grasbroek Sessies (2015)
 Aan (2017)
 Polaroid (2022)

References

External links
 
Interview in English with keyboard player Bas Kennis about the band
 Chris Götte memorial website
Review of Oktober (in English)

Videos
"Holiday in Spain" sung in two languages as a duet with Counting Crows
"Blof: de wereld draait door"

Dutch pop music groups
Musical groups from Zeeland
Vlissingen